Katherine Gertrude Hoffmann (née Hay, May 7, 1883 – October 21, 1966) was an American early 20th-century vaudeville dancer and choreographer.

Early life
Katherine “Kitty” Gertrude Hay was born in San Francisco on May 7, 1883, the daughter of John and Katherine (née Brogan) Hay. Her father, who was born in Bangor, Maine, in 1843, came to California sometime before 1873. Katherine Brogan was born in Ireland around 1847 and came to America in the early 1860s. John and Katherine Hay moved to Portland, Oregon, where John died in 1914. Katherine Brogan Hay died in 1926 at the Long Island summer house of her daughter, Gertrude. Gertrude received her early education at a San Francisco area Catholic convent.

Katherine had been performing on stage for some time as Kitty Hayes before catching the eye of actress Florence Roberts playing a French dancer in Jules Massenet’s five-act opera Sapho at San Francisco’s Alcazar Theatre. Not long after Robert's  encouragement to pursue a career in dance, Gertrude signed on at the age of sixteen as a dancer with the vaudeville comedy team of Matthews and Bulger and began a tour that would eventually take her to New York City and the Paradise Roof Garden atop Oscar Hammerstein's Victoria Theatre.

Career

In 1903 Gertrude Hoffmann was hired as a rehearsal director at Oscar Hammerstein’s Victoria Theater working with the sixty member "Punch and Judy Co." shows and other vaudeville routines performing at the venue. Willie Hammerstein persuaded her to appear on the stage. Three years later she replaced an ill performer in Ziegfeld’s "The Parisian Dancer" and became a hit imitating Anna Held singing "I Just Can’t Make My Eyes Behave". Over her career, Gertrude also did impersonations of various other performers, such as Eva Tanguay, Eddie Foy, and Ethel Barrymore.

Her choreography and special dance effects brought her high praise and rebuke. Her role as Salome in "Vision of Salome" which she introduced around 1908 caused scandal at many theater houses around the country. On several occasions her suggestive dance style in scant costumes would lead to her arrest by local police. Eva Tanguay, Vera Olcott, and Lotta Faust would also find success with the Salome dance.

Later in her career she became manager and choreographer of the Gertrude Hoffmann Girls. Reminiscent of the Tiller Girls, her dancers used a type of athletic acrobatic transformation of the chorus girl with kicks, leaps, etc. The Gertrude Hoffmann Girls performed in the Shubert review Artists and Models that ran for the entire 1925-26 season at the Winter Garden and also had long runs over the following two seasons with A Night in Paris and A Night in Spain. In 1933 she resurrected the Hoffmann dancers and had some success touring America and Europe prior the outbreak of the Second World War. Not much is known of her later life other than she may have at one time operated a dance studio or club in Southern California.

In 2006 the social historian Armond Fields listed Gertrude Hoffmann in his book Women Vaudeville Stars: Eighty Biographical Profiles. The Gertrude Hoffmann Glide, a two step or turkey-trot dance named after her in 1913, was recorded by the Victor Military Band and sold through Sears Catalogs.

Marriage
Gertrude married Max Hoffmann (1873–1963), a composer, songwriter and vaudeville orchestra leader, on April 8, 1901 in Baltimore. Her husband's full name and title was said to be “Baron” Adolph Eugene Victor Maximilian Hoffmann. Though born in Poland most likely of German descent, the title "Baron" is dubious since he was raised in St. Paul, Minnesota. On most public records and travel documents over the years, their surname was recorded as Hoffmann, rather than Hoffman.  Max Hoffmann throughout their marriage worked with Gertrude as her music director and manager. Their son, professionally known as Max Hoffmann Jr. (1902–1945), was born the year following their marriage at Norfolk, Virginia and would go on to be a musical-comedy performer on Broadway and in films. Max Jr. was for a brief period of time married to the noted Boop-Boop-a Doop singer Helen Kane.

Death
Gertrude Hoffmann died on the 21 October 1966 in Los Angeles, California.

References

 The History of European Photography 1900-1938, FOTOFO., 2011.

External links

Lots of Glitter, Girls and Whirls - The New York Times
Library of Congress Photographed with lion's head.
Biography of Katherine Gertrude Hay Hoffman by ragtime historian Bill Edwards - RagPiano.com

1883 births
1966 deaths
American choreographers
American female dancers
American impressionists (entertainers)
Comedians from California
Dancers from California
People from San Francisco
Vaudeville performers